Fred Pancoast (born ) is an American human resources executive and former college football player and coach. He served as the head football coach at the University of Tampa (1962–1963), Memphis State University, now the University of Memphis, (1972–1974), and Vanderbilt University (1975–1978), compiling a career college football record of 41–51–4.

Pancoast was born in Pensacola, Florida and graduated from Pensacola High School in 1949. He played football at the University of Tampa and was inducted into the school's Athletic Hall of Fame in 1967. After graduating from college, he served in the United States Marine Corps and later became an educator. Pancoast also coached at Hillsborough High School in Tampa, Florida.

From 1962 to 1963, Pancoast served as the head football coach at Tampa. From 1964 to 1968, he was the offensive backfield coach at the University of Florida and in 1969 was promoted to the offensive coordinator position and helped the offense set numerous school records. He also served as the school's quarterback coach, where he coached Heisman Trophy winner, Steve Spurrier. From 1970 to 1971, he was the offensive coordinator at University of Georgia.

From 1972 to 1974, Pancoast guided Memphis to a 20–12–1 record. He didn't enjoy the same success at Vanderbilt, where he coached from 1975 to 1978. He compiled a 13–31 record there. In his final three seasons, he posted three straight 2–9 records.

After coaching football, Pancoast went into human resources. In 1980, he took a job with Murray Manufacturing Company as director of human resources. In 1985, Pancoast founded Pancoast Benefits, an employee benefits marketing and consulting firm.

He was awarded the Lifetime Achievement Award from the Tennessee Sports Hall of Fame in 2007. In 2008 he was given the President's Volunteer Service Award by President George W. Bush.  In 2011, he received the Fred Russell Distinguished American Award from the Middle Tennessee Chapter of the National Football Foundation and College Hall of Fame.

Head coaching record

References

1930s births
Living people
Florida Gators football coaches
Georgia Bulldogs football coaches
Memphis Tigers football coaches
Sportspeople from Pensacola, Florida
Tampa Spartans football coaches
Tampa Spartans football players
United States Marines
Vanderbilt Commodores football coaches
Coaches of American football from Florida
Players of American football from Pensacola, Florida